Miguel Ángel Almirón Rejala (born 10 February 1994) is a Paraguayan professional footballer who plays as an attacking midfielder or winger for Premier League club Newcastle United and the Paraguay national team.

Almirón began his career at Cerro Porteño and transferred to Lanús in 2015. After winning the 2016 Argentine Primera División, he signed for Atlanta United for $8 million. He was named in the MLS Best XI for both of his seasons in Major League Soccer, as well as MLS Newcomer of the Year for 2017. After helping Atlanta to the MLS Cup 2018 he signed for Newcastle for £21 million, a club record and the highest fee for an MLS player.

Almirón made his international debut for Paraguay in 2015, and represented the country at the Copa América in 2016, 2019 and 2021.

Early life
Almirón grew up in an impoverished family in the San Pablo neighborhood of Asunción, where his father Ruben worked 18-hour shifts as a security guard and his mother Sonia worked in a supermarket. The seven members of his household slept in three bedrooms, and he had to share a bed with his mother until he was 18.

Club career

Cerro Porteño
Rejected from Club Nacional for being too lightweight, Almirón moved to Cerro Porteño. His new club still had reservations about his physique, and he did not play regularly until he was on their under-17 side.

Lanús
In August 2015, Almirón signed for Club Atlético Lanús in the Argentine Primera División. Introduced slowly in his first season by Lanús manager Guillermo Barros Schelotto, Almirón came to the forefront the next season in the shortened 2016 Argentine Primera División under Jorge Almirón. Playing as an advanced central midfielder, Almirón was pivotal in Lanús' 2016 Argentine Primera División title win, scoring key goals against local rivals Banfield in the Clásico del Sur, and later in the final against San Lorenzo. A few months later, in August 2016, Almirón set-up the only goal in Lanús' Copa Bicentenario victory over Racing.

Atlanta United FC
On 5 December 2016, Almirón signed with the new Major League Soccer expansion team Atlanta United FC. He joined as a "Young Designated Player" and Atlanta paid a transfer fee of around $8 million to Lanús.

Almirón was an important figure in Atlanta United's first season, described as the "heartbeat" of the team by veteran teammate Jeff Larentowicz. On 12 March, Almirón scored his first goals for the club, notching a brace in the club's second game, a 6–1 victory over fellow MLS newcomers Minnesota United FC. He scored the second hat-trick in club history on 20 May against the Houston Dynamo, and scored two goals a week later against New York City FC. Almirón joined teammates Greg Garza and Michael Parkhurst in the MLS All-Star Game on 2 August, and topped the league's list of 24 players under the age of 24, released on 28 September. During the regular season, Almirón was named to seven Teams of the Week by Major League Soccer, and was named Player of the Week twice. At the end of the season, he was named to the league's Best XI and was named Newcomer of the Year.

In April 2018, Almirón was named MLS Player of the Month for his five goals and two assists as Atlanta went unbeaten with three wins and a draw. With 12 goals and 14 assists, he was again named in the MLS Best XI, alongside teammate Josef Martínez. Atlanta won MLS Cup 2018 against the Portland Timbers in only their second season of existence, and Almirón was named in the Team of the 2018 MLS Cup Playoffs.

Newcastle United

On 31 January 2019, Almirón joined Premier League side Newcastle United for an undisclosed fee on a five-and-a-half year deal. The transfer fee is believed to be around £21 million, at the time, a club record fee, and a record for an MLS player. He made his Premier League debut on 11 February in a 1–1 draw at Wolverhampton Wanderers, playing the final 18 minutes in place of Christian Atsu. Fans and media likened Almirón to Santiago Muñez, a fictional Newcastle player from the film Goal! who also originated from Latin America and moved to St James' Park via the United States. During a match against Southampton on 20 April, he was tackled by Oriol Romeu and suffered a hamstring injury that ruled him out for the rest of the season. Almirón struggled to score in his first months with Newcastle, but helped his side to avoid relegation. After registering a total of 40 shots with no goals, he scored his first Premier League goal on 21 December in a 1–0 victory over Crystal Palace. He finished the season with a club-best eight goals in all competitions.

On 6 February 2021, Almirón scored twice in a 3–2 home win over Southampton, a game in which he ran 11.29 km, the most on his team. He had then scored four goals in his last 12 Premier League games, the same as he scored in the 55 before that.

On 21 August 2022, Almirón broke a goal-scoring drought by scoring an equalizer against Manchester City, following a cross from Newcastle teammate Allan Saint-Maximin. In October, Almirón scored six goals in six matches, with two goals against Fulham, and one each against Brentford, Everton, Tottenham Hotspur and Aston Villa, reaching seven Premier League goals for the season, the most in his time in the Premier League. Following that success, he won Premier League Player of the Month for October 2022 and Premier League Goal of the Month for his first-half goal against Fulham. On 6 November, Almirón continued his scoring run with the opening goal against Southampton in a 4–1 victory, scoring his seventh goal in as many games, one more than in his previous 74 Premier League appearances. The next weekend against Chelsea, his scoring run came to an end, but he assisted Joe Willock for the only goal of the game.

On 24 February 2023, Almirón signed a new three-and-a-half year contact with the club.

International career
Almirón played for the Paraguay under-20 national team in the 2013 South American Youth Football Championship in Argentina, and was highly involved as his team finished second to Colombia. Later that year, he was called up for the 2013 FIFA U-20 World Cup in Turkey, where Paraguay reached the last 16.

On 5 September 2015, Almirón made his senior international debut in a 3–2 friendly loss away to Chile, playing the final nine minutes in place of Jonathan Fabbro. Manager Ramón Díaz called him up the following May for the Copa América Centenario in the United States, where he started two matches in a group-stage exit.

In March 2019, in a friendly against Mexico at Levi's Stadium, Almirón came on as a substitute. Seven minutes later, he received a straight red card for a foul on José Juan Vázquez in which he dragged his studs down the back of the opponent's leg. On 10 October the same year, he was sent off for diving in a 1–0 friendly loss to Serbia.

Personal life
Almirón is a practicing Christian and has two religious quotes tattooed on his arms. He has been married to his wife Alexia Notto since November 2016; the couple's first child, a son, was born in June 2021.

Career statistics

Club

International

As of match played 10 June 2022. Paraguay score listed first, score column indicates score after each Almirón goal.

Honours
Cerro Porteño
Paraguayan Primera División: 2013 Clausura, 2015 Apertura

Lanús
Argentine Primera División: 2016
Copa Bicentenario: 2016

Atlanta United FC
MLS Cup: 2018

Newcastle United
EFL Cup runner-up: 2022–23

Individual
Paraguayan Footballer of the Year (ABC Color vote): 2017, 2018, 2022
Paraguayan Footballer of the Year (Public vote): 2017, 2022
MLS Best XI: 2017, 2018
MLS Newcomer of the Year: 2017
MLS All-Star: 2017, 2018
MLS Player of the Month: April 2018
Premier League Player of the Month: October 2022
Premier League Goal of the Month: April 2022, October 2022
PFA Fans' Player of the Month: October 2022

References

External links

1994 births
Living people
Sportspeople from Asunción
Paraguayan footballers
Association football midfielders
Cerro Porteño players
Club Atlético Lanús footballers
Atlanta United FC players
Newcastle United F.C. players
Paraguayan Primera División players
Argentine Primera División players
Major League Soccer players
Major League Soccer All-Stars
Designated Players (MLS)
Premier League players
Paraguay under-20 international footballers
Paraguay international footballers
Footballers at the 2015 Pan American Games
Copa América Centenario players
2019 Copa América players
2021 Copa América players
Paraguayan expatriate footballers
Paraguayan expatriate sportspeople in Argentina
Paraguayan expatriate sportspeople in the United States
Paraguayan expatriate sportspeople in England
Expatriate footballers in Argentina
Expatriate soccer players in the United States
Expatriate footballers in England
Pan American Games competitors for Paraguay